The 2008 Spanish GP2 round was a GP2 Series motor race held on 26 April and 27 April 2008 at the Circuit de Catalunya in Montmeló, Catalonia, Spain. It was the first race of the 2008 GP2 Series season. The race was used to support the 2008 Spanish Grand Prix.

Classification

Qualifying

Feature race

Sprint race

References

Catalunya
Catalunya Gp2 Round, 2008